Have a Ball is the first studio album by Me First and the Gimme Gimmes, released in 1997 on the Fat Wreck Chords independent record label. The album is made up entirely of "Hits of the '60s and '70s", with the exception of Billy Joel's "Uptown Girl", originally released in 1983.

Track listing

Personnel
 Spike Slawson - vocals
 Chris Shiflett (a.k.a. Jake Jackson) - lead guitar
 Joey Cape - rhythm guitar
 Fat Mike - bass
 Dave Raun - drums

See also 
Me First and the Gimme Gimmes discography

References 

1997 debut albums
Me First and the Gimme Gimmes albums
Fat Wreck Chords albums